The Holly Hill Municipal Building (also known as the Holly Hill City Hall) is a historic building in Holly Hill, Florida, United States. It is located at 1065 Ridgewood Avenue. On April 8, 1993, it was added to the U.S. National Register of Historic Places.

References

External links
 Volusia County listings at Florida's Office of Cultural and Historical Programs

National Register of Historic Places in Volusia County, Florida
City and town halls in Florida
Vernacular architecture in Florida
City and town halls on the National Register of Historic Places in Florida